Space Station Seventh Grade is a young adult novel by Jerry Spinelli, published in 1982; it was his debut novel. It was inspired by an odd event when one of his six children ate some fried chicken that he had been saving for the next day.
The novel was intended for adults but became a young adult novel instead.

Plot summary

Seventh-grader Jason Herkimer narrates the events of his year, from school, hair, and pimples, to mothers, little brothers, and a girl. It is a story about being true to yourself and the nostalgic recollection of adolescent years.
Jason has a crush on a cheerleader, Debbie. He also has trouble fitting in at school. He goes through a lot of natural teenage problems and shares the experiences.

Sequel
Spinelli wrote about the same characters in Jason and Marceline (1986).

Characters

Jason - Main character, narrated from his point of view. Ate a dust-covered donut and he loves science. He is making a space station throughout the novel which will be a self-sustaining environment. He thinks about Pioneer a lot. 92-pound linebacker on the football team. He collects dinosaurs. He feels bad about possibly killing a raccoon. He has trouble fitting in at school and has to find ways to cope with his problems.

Richie Bell - Jason's best friend, another 7th grader. Member of the group which consists of Jason, Calvin, Peter, and Dugan. Gets peed on by a 9th grader while using a school urinal. Bags groceries with Jason to earn money on which they end up spending on cupcakes.

Peter Kim - One of the friends, Korean-American. Takes anything said 'just right'. Has a little brother named Kippy Kim who follows the gang around during Halloween dressed up as Fu-Machu.

Calvin Lemaine - One of the friends, African-American. Aspires to become a doctor. Has a collection of bugs and insects in his bedroom.

Dugan - One of the friends, a rascal. Attends a Catholic school, unlike the rest of the boys who all attend public school. Is unafraid of basically anything, including walking around the dance floor primarily inhabited by intimidating 9th graders. Jason refers to him as showing up and finding stuff.

Debbie Breen - A cheerleader, one of the most popular girls in school, and gorgeous. She was Jason's original crush, but he lost interest in her after finding out that she had romantic feelings for another guy. 
 
Marceline McAllister - Misfit girl at school. Plays the trombone. Kind of tall and gawky. Rides a bike, in the end hits a cow. She knocks Jason over in a snowball fight and shoves snow in his face. Hates McDonald's. Can run the mile faster than Jason, which irks him, however, he beats her in the final mile race at the end of the book. Jason gets suspended for skipping out on Marceline's trombone performance and is forced to apologize to her. Since then, Jason could not stand her and complains every time that he has contact with her. But at the end of the book, she and Jason become sweethearts.

Kippy Kim - Peters little brother that tagged along with Peter almost everywhere he went. The group thought he's annoying. He is immature in ways and Jason played a prank on him and Jason's brother. The prank was pretending a dinosaur was in the area and Kippy got so scared, he had to go home. He Dies in a car accident near the end of the book.

Cootyhead {Mary}- Jason's little sister who often tattles on Jason.

Timmy- Jason's little brother who likes to steal his dinosaurs. Jason likes to tease him.

Ham {Hamilton}- Jason's stepfather who acts a lot and is very good at it. Jason often steals his lunch, chicken.

1982 American novels
Novels by Jerry Spinelli
American young adult novels
Novels set in elementary and primary schools
1982 children's books
1982 debut novels